Vermont Route 30 (VT 30) is a  north–south state highway in the U.S. state of Vermont. VT 30 runs from U.S. Route 5 (US 5) and VT 9 in Brattleboro to US 7 and VT 125 in Middlebury. The northern portion, from Poultney to Middlebury, was part of the New England road marking system's Route 30, from which VT 30 got its number. The route passes through many historic small towns, and travel writers such as those at Southern Vermont have described the route as "idyllic" and "picturesque".

Route description

VT 30 starts in a residential neighborhood in Brattleboro and begins to follow the West River northwest through West Dummerston, Newfane, Townshend, and Jamaica. At Jamaica, the route climbs out of the West River valley and into Winhall, passing close to Stratton Mountain and Bromley Mountain ski areas. The route then joins VT 11 and proceeds southwest down the western slopes of the Green Mountains into Manchester, where it has an interchange with US-7. At the roundabout in Manchester Center, it again turns northwest, following the Mettawee River Drainage through the Taconic Mountains in the towns of Dorset, Pawlet, and Wells. In Poultney, VT 30 passes along the eastern edge of Lake St. Catherine State Park. At Poultney, VT 30 takes on a northerly course, then crosses US-4 in Castleton. To the north in Hubbardton, VT 30 runs along the eastern shore of Lake Bomoseen. It then continues almost due north with panoramic views of the Green Mountains and Adirondacks along a hilltop through pasture land in the towns of Sudbury, Whiting, and Cornwall. VT 30 then descends and turns northeast, following North Main Street past Middlebury College into a residential section of Middlebury, where it soon terminates at a roundabout with VT 125.

History

From 1922 until 1926, New England Route 30 (part of the New England road marking system) ran from Granville, New York, through Poultney (via New York State Route 22A), continuing north through Burlington, to Alburg. The northern sections of Route 30 were assigned in 1926 to U.S. Route 7 (US 7) from Middlebury to Burlington, and to US 2 from Burlington to Alburg. Soon afterwards, Vermont extended the Route 30 designation southeast to its current Brattleboro terminus. (VT 30 to Brattleboro had been in place by 1933.) In August 2011, Hurricane Irene heavily damaged large sections of VT 30 and made it impassable for a period of time.

Major intersections

References

External links

030